Dainty may refer to:

 9758 Dainty, asteroid
 HMS Dainty, four ships of the Royal Navy
 Dainty, a street ball game played in Schnitzelburg, Louisville

People with the surname 
 Bert Dainty (1879–1961), an English footballer and manager
 Billy Dainty (1927–1986), a British comedian
 Christopher Dainty, American physicist
 Harold Dainty (1892–1961), an English cricketer

See also